Traxx is a 1988 action/adventure comedy film that was directed by Jerome Gary. It released on August 17, 1988 and starred Shadoe Stevens as a mercenary turned cookie maker. The film had a budget of 6.5 million dollars and was initially intended to have a theatrical release, but was instead released direct to video. Traxx was later screened in 2012 at the Hollywood Theatre in Portland, Oregon.

Plot
Opening in 1984, Traxx is a Texas State Trooper who has little respect for the rules of the police force due to perps frequently getting away with their crimes through legal technicalities or playing the "temporary insanity" case in court. As a result, Traxx makes every effort possible to kill criminals after catching them in the act which earns him scorn from his superiors. In the opening scene, Traxx is one of several troopers called to defuse a hostage situation where a deranged holdup man has taken refuge in a pet store after shooting and killing an old lady and a puppy. Traxx storms the store and when the killer gives up and vows to plead temporary insanity, Traxx shoots and kills him anyway. After being reprimanded one too many times by the police commissioner for excessive use of force, Traxx quits and leaves town to become a soldier of fortune.

Four years later, after battling his way through El Salvador, the Middle East, and Nicaragua and killing countless terrorists, Traxx decides to retire to a life of baking gourmet cookies in his hometown, inspired by the cookies of Wally Amos (who late in the film appears in a cameo playing himself). When he finds himself in need of money, Traxx decides to hire himself out as the "Town Tamer" and begins cleaning up his hometown of Hadleyville, Texas by killing off its lowlife street scum, aided by fellow mercenary Deeter. Traxx is supported in his mercenary efforts by the amorous town mayor Alexandra Clay, who continuously tries to have sex with Traxx, and Hadleyville police chief Decker, who agrees to pay Traxx an off the books sum of $10,000 per week to clean up their town. Traxx does well with his new assassin-for-hire business, however, things do not go as smoothly as he would have hoped. Traxx's actions soon come to the attention of the local crime boss Aldo Palucci. Fearing that Traxx will bring about the downfall of his business, Palucci initially tries to bribe Traxx. When that doesn't work, and his own men are unable to kill him, he hires the dreaded Guzik brothers, a trio of ruthless but comic hitmen from Mexico to get rid of Traxx, which leads to a climatic showdown in the streets.

In the final scene, after Palucci accidentally blows himself up when he lights a cigar in his car after letting out a long and disgusting fart as a critcism of Traxx's cookies, Traxx defeats the three Guzik brothers and finally opens up his own cookie store called 'Snaxx by Traxx', using the reward money given for the bounty on the bad guys heads. Mayor Clay throws a large street fair to celebrate the town's centennial and its now crime-free streets.

Cast
Shadoe Stevens as Traxx
Priscilla Barnes as Mayor Alexandria Cray
Willard E. Pugh as Deeter
Robert Davi as Aldo Palucci
John Hancock as Chief Emmett Decker
Hugh Gillin as Commissioner R.B. Davis
Michael Kirk as Deputy Mayhew
Raymond O'Connor as Tibbs
Herschel Sparber as Guzik #1
Jonathan Lutz as Guzik #2
Lucius Houghton as Guzik #3
Darrow Igus as Wendell
Arlene Lorre as Celeste
Rick Overton as Frank Williams
Robert Miano as Arturo
Steve Boles as Lonnie
J. Michael Hunter as Matt
Leon Rippy as The Killer in pet store
Darrow Igus as Wendell
Arlene Lorre as Celeste
Wally Amos as Famous Amos
Wallace Merck as Jerome
Jerry Colker as Kent

Reception 
In his book 80s Action Movies on the Cheap, Daniel R. Budnik wrote that the film is "sort of a parody but not quite" of 1980s action film excess.  Budnik compared it to Sledge Hammer!, saying that audiences may have misinterpreted the film and been offended by the over-the-top violence.

References

External links
 
 
 

1988 films
1988 direct-to-video films
1980s action comedy films
Direct-to-video action comedy films
American action comedy films
De Laurentiis Entertainment Group films
1988 comedy films
Films set in 1984
Films with screenplays by Gary DeVore
Films set in Texas
Films produced by Gary DeVore
American exploitation films
American vigilante films
1980s English-language films
1980s American films